Bindu Nanubhai Desai (born 17 April 1941), better known mononymously as Bindu, is a former Indian actress who was popular in the 1970s. She has acted in over 160 movies in a career that spanned four decades, receiving seven Filmfare award nominations. She is most remembered for her role as Shabnam in Kati Patang (1970) and for her films opposite Prem Chopra.

Bindu made her film debut in 1962, starring in her first movie Anpadh as Kiran. In 1969, she starred in Ittefaq as Renu, and in Do Raaste as Neela. Both films were box-office hits, and Bindu had then received her first nominations for a Filmfare award for her performances in both of the films. In 1972, she starred in Dastaan as Mala, and received her third nomination for a Filmfare award for the film. In 1973, Bindu was then cast in Abhimaan as Chitra. The film was yet another box-office hit, attributing to Bindu's credibility at the time. Her performance in the movie led her to receive her fourth nomination for a Filmfare award. Then, in 1974, she starred in films Hawas as Kamini, and in Imtihan as Rita. Both films were commercially successful, and Bindu received two more Filmfare nominations. In 1976, she then starred in Arjun Pandit as Sarla, and received her last nomination for a Filmfare award.

Early life
Bindu was born to film producer Nanubhai Desai and Jyotsna in Hanuman Bhagda, a small village in the Valsad district in Gujarat and was raised alongside her seven siblings. Bindu's father died in 1954 when she was 13 and being the eldest daughter, the burden of earning money fell on her shoulders.

Actors/Directors/Producers Aruna Irani, Indra Kumar, Adi Irani and Firoz Irani are her first cousins (Their mothers are sisters).

Career
Bindu had early successes with Do Raaste and Ittefaq  in 1969. From here she went on to write her success story with Shakti Samanta's Kati Patang (1970), where she had a sizzling cabaret dance, "Mera Naam Shabnam" to her credit; a number which is even today remembered as one of the highlights of the film.

Bindu's mesmerising performances in 1974 as a seductress in Imtihan, and as a nymphomaniac in Hawas, left audiences asking for more. With a string of hits behind her, she successfully managed to break out of the myth that married actresses usually do not go to become sex symbols, especially in the Hindi film industry. She is the third point in the 'holy trinity' of item number queens. Along with Helen and Aruna Irani, Bindu defined the Bollywood 'cabaret' dance number and the role of the 'Vamp'.

Her acting ability was seen in films like Hrishikesh Mukherjee's films Arjun Pandit and Abhimaan, where she won raves for playing a very sympathetic character. She proved to be just as convincing as the crippled woman in Chaitali and as the deglamorised role of wife to Ashok Kumar, in Arjun Pandit. She played the villain's moll in Zanjeer and became famous as Mona Darling.

She was paired opposite Prem Chopra regularly in films such as Lagan, Kati Patang, Do Raaste, Chhupa Rustam, Prem Nagar, Phandebaaz, Tyaag, Nafrat, Gehri Chaal and Dastaan.She even danced with Sivaji Ganesan in Tamil film Naladhu Oru Kudumbam in 1979.She did 13 films with Rajesh Khanna from 1969 film Do Raaste to 1986 film Adhikar.

An impending pregnancy, followed by a miscarriage, brought about a lull in her career and on the advice of her doctors she had to end her stint as the glamorous 'vamp' – dancing and all in 1983. However, she did not stay away for long and returned to the silver screen with character roles – Hero, Alag Alag, Biwi Ho To Aisi and Kishen Kanhaiya and with many other such movies she managed to re-establish herself as the unmerciful and cruel mother-in-law, or the cynical aunt.

In the later stages of her career, she made fewer on-screen appearances, like the ones in Shola Aur Shabnam, Aankhen which highlighted her comic side, and followed with other light and funny performances in Hum Aapke Hain Koun..!, Main Hoon Na, and Om Shanti Om.

Awards and nominations

Selected filmography 

Santan (1959) as Shyama
 Ek Phool Char Kante (1960) 
 Anpadh (1962)  as Kiran
 Aya Sawan Jhoom Ke (1969)
 Nateeja (1969)
 Ittefaq (1969) as Renu
 Do Raaste (1969) as Neela
 Kati Patang (1970) as Shabnam
 Preet Ki Dori (1971)
 Amar Prem (1971)
 Dushman (1971) as Special Appearance
 Haseenon Ka Devata (1971)
 Dastaan (1972) as Mala Sahay
 Dil Ka Raaja (1972)
 Ek Bechara (1972)
 Garam Masala (1972) as Neelima
 Raja Jani (1972) as Special Appearance
 Mere Jeevan Saathi (1972)
 Dharma (1973)
 Zanjeer (1973) as Mona
 Gaai Aur Gori (1973) as Mohini
 Gehri Chaal (1973) as Shobha
 Joshila (1973)
 Anhonee (1973)
 Abhimaan (1973)
 Suraj Aur Chanda (1973)
 Hawas (1974) as Kamini
 Free Love (1974)
 Imtihan (1974) as Rita
 Pagli (1974)
 Prem Nagar (1974)
 Bangaarada Panjara (1974 Kannada film) as Reshma
 Chaitali (1975)
 Dafaa 302 (1975)
 Jaggu (1975)
 Sewak (1975)
 Dhoti Lota Aur Chowpatty (1975) as Dancer
Aaj Ka Mahaatma (1976)
 Arjun Pandit  (1976)
 Shankar Shambhu (1976) as Munni Bai
 Shankar Dada (1976) as Bindiya
 Shaque (1976) as Rosita
 Dus Numbri (1976)
 Nehle Peh Dehlaa (1976) Filomina
 Thief of Baghdad (1977)
 Do Chehere (1977) as Dancer
 Hira Aur Patthar (1977)
 Chakkar Pe Chakkar (1977)
 Chala Murari Hero Banne (1977)
 Chalta Purza (1977)
 Maha Badmaash (1977)
 Bandie (1978)
 Chor Ho To Aisa (1978)
 Des Pardes (1978) as Sylvia
 Ganga Ki Saugandh (1978)
 Besharam (1978) as Manju
 Jalan (1978)
 Trishna (1978)
 Phandebaaz (1978)
 Rahu Ketu  (1978)
 Ram Kasam (1978)
 Amar Deep (1979) as Asha
 Nallathoru Kudumbam (1979 Tamil film) as the Dancer in One and two cha cha song
 Inspector Eagle (1979)
 Allaudinaum Arputha Vilakkum (1979 Tamil–Malayalam bilingual) as the Dancer in a song
 Khandaan (1979) as Nanda V. Shrivastav
 Sarkari Mehmaan (1979)
 Agreement (1980)
 Jwalamukhi (1980)
 Shaan (1980) as Special Appearance
 Naseeb (1981) as Special Appearance
 Laawaris (1981)
 Prem Rog (1982)
 Hero (1983) as Jamna
 Divorce (1984)
 Paisa Yeh Paisa (1985)
 Aaj Ka Daur (1985)
 Karma (1986)
 Hifazat (1987)
 Biwi Ho To Aisi (1988)
 Kishen Kanhaiya (1990) as Kamini
 Ghar Ho To Aisa (1990)
 Honeymoon (1992)
 Shola Aur Shabnam (1992)
 Aankhen (1993)
 Aasoo Bane Angaarey (1993)
 Roop Ki Rani Choron Ka Raja (1993)
 Chhoti Bahoo (1994)
 Krantiveer (1994) as Special Appearance
 Hum Aapke Hain Koun..! (1994) as Bhagwanti Kashyap
 Judwaa (1997) as Sundari Motwani
 Banarasi Babu (1997)
 Ehsaas is Tarah (1998)
 Aunty No. 1 (1998)
 Jaanam Samjha Karo (1999)
 Pyaar Koi Khel Nahin (1999)
 Sooryavansham (1999)
 Mere Yaar Ki Shaadi Hai (2002)
 Main Hoon Na (2004)
 Om Shanti Om (2007)
 Mehbooba (2008)

References

External links

 

Actresses from Gujarat
1941 births
Living people
20th-century Indian actresses
21st-century Indian actresses
Indian film actresses
Actresses in Hindi cinema
Actresses in Gujarati cinema
People from Valsad district
Actresses in Kannada cinema
Actresses in Malayalam cinema